The Women's 10,000 metres at the 2014 Commonwealth Games, as part of the athletics programme, was held at Hampden Park on 29 July 2014.

Results

References

Women's 10,000 metres
2014
2014 in women's athletics